Martina Hingis was the defending champion, but she retired from tennis the previous year.

Dinara Safina won the title, defeating Svetlana Kuznetsova in the final 6–1, 6–3. This was Safina's fourth title of the season.

This was the first edition of the Toray Pan Pacific Open to be held on outdoor hard courts; previously, the tournament had been held on indoor carpet courts.

Seeds
The top four seeds receive a bye into the second round.

Draw

Finals

Top half

Bottom half

References

External links
Draw and Qualifying Draw

Pan Pacific Open
Toray Pan Pacific Open - Singles
2008 Toray Pan Pacific Open